Harit Cheewagaroon (born 8 March 1997), also known as also known as Sing, is a Thai actor. He is known for his main role as Ohm in GMMTV's The Gifted (2018) and support roles as Per in Love Sick: The Series (2014) and as Din in Senior Secret Love: Puppy Honey (2016).

Early life and education 
Harit was born in Bangkok, Thailand. He completed his secondary education at Bangkok Christian College, where he participated and won the top prize in the Siam Kolkarn Family Popular Music The 1st Concert 2012. In 2020, he graduated with a bachelor's degree in communication arts at Bangkok University together with fellow actor Thiti Mahayotaruk (Bank).

Career 
He started his acting career in 2014 by playing a support role in Love Sick: The Series (2014–2015). He later became part of GMMTV where he played main and support roles in several television series such as Senior Secret Love: Puppy Honey (2016), Slam Dance (2017), The Gifted (2018) and He's Coming To Me (2019).

He recently played the role of GD in One Night Steal (2019) and Chaowat (Pete) in Who Are You (2020).

Filmography

Television

Discography

References

External links 
 
 

1997 births
Living people
Harit Cheewagaroon
Harit Cheewagaroon
Harit Cheewagaroon
Harit Cheewagaroon
Harit Cheewagaroon